Pierre-Hugues Herbert and Nicolas Renavand are the defending champions, but lost in the first round this year.
Lukáš Dlouhý and Gilles Müller won the title, defeating Xavier Malisse and Ken Skupski 6–2, 6–7(5–7), [10–7] in the final.

Seeds

Draw

Draw

References
 Main draw

Doubles